Sally Anne Marsh (born 14 October 1972) is a British actress and singer. She was a member of Faith Hope & Charity, later becoming the vocalist for a number of groups, including Xpansions, Ariel and Hysterix. Her film credits include The Princess and the Goblin and A Monkey's Tale, and she also appeared in a number of TV productions.

Performing career
Sally Anne Marsh began singing when she was six, and acted in the children TV show Tricky Business as a teenager. She was a member of a short lived girlband with Diana Barrand and Dani Behr called Faith Hope & Charity.

After Faith Hope and Charity, her musical career included being the vocalist for electronic music group Xpansions whose major techno hit single Move Your Body (Elevation) reached Number 7 in 1991. This song has been remixed and rereleased several times over the nineties due to demand. Marsh then became the lead singer of deConstruction house group Ariel who were formed by Tom Rowlands of The Chemical Brothers with whom she appeared on Channel 4's The Word. She recorded two promo only singles working with producers Mike Stock & Matt Aitken in 1995 on their Love This Records label. These were a cover of the Mungo Jerry hit "In the Summertime" and a dance version of "Windmills of your Mind". Recently, she has been working as lead vocalist for the London band Brand Violet.

In addition to her musical career, she is a freelance voiceover artiste who does work for GCap Media and EMAP radio, as well as the Tindle Radio Group.

As an actress, she has appeared in children's programmes as many characters including Vicky in Bodger and Badger (in which she played a drumkit), Nurse Kitty in Hilltop Hospital, Lucy in BBC's Tricky Business, Princess Irene in The Princess and the Goblin, Gina in A Monkey's Tale, Giselle in Santa and the Tooth Fairies and its sequel TV series Tales of the Tooth Fairies and Cecile Lefevre in Grange Hill. Sally Ann Marsh also voiced the character of Snow White in the 2006 Picha production of Snow White: The Sequel.

Singles
Xpansions – Move Your Body (Elevation) (Arista Records) – 1991 – Frontwoman
Ariel – Let it Slide! (deConstruction Records – 1993)
Xpansions – Move Your Body '95 (Arista Records) – 1995
Sally Anne Marsh – "In the Summertime" [Promo Only] – 1995)
Sally Anne Marsh – Windmills Of Your Mind [Promo Only] – 1995
Aurora – Hear You Calling (Original Mother Earth) – 1999 – Vocals
Brand Violet – Alien Hive Theme (Brand Violet Limited) – 2004 – Lead Vocals
Brand Violet – Head (Brand Violet Limited) – 2004
Brand Violet – Voodoo (Brand Violet Limited) – 2004
Brand Violet – Sputnik Bride EP (Brand Violet Limited) – 2005
Brand Violet – Legend of Ladybeard (Brand Violet Limited) – 2005

Faith Hope & Charity
For the group, see Faith Hope & Charity

Albums
Brand Violet – Retrovision Coma (Brand Violet Limited) – 2004 (Lead vocalist)
Brand Violet – Akathisia (Brand Violet Limited) – 2005

Filmography

References

External links
 [ AllMusic.com: Biography]
 
 Brand Violet
 XPansions Discography
 Ariel on Last FM
 Faith Hope & Charity

1972 births
Living people
20th-century English actresses
20th-century English women singers
21st-century English actresses
21st-century English women singers
English dance musicians
English television actresses
English voice actresses
Musicians from Kent
People from Pembury